The Minister of Tourism, Trade and Industry is a senior member of the Constitutional Government of East Timor heading the Ministry of Tourism, Trade and Industry.

Functions
Under the Constitution of East Timor, the Minister has the power and the duty:

Where the Minister is in charge of the subject matter of a government statute, the Minister is also required, together with the Prime Minister, to sign the statute.

Incumbent
The incumbent Minister of Tourism, Trade and Industry is José Lucas do Carmo da Silva.  He is assisted by Inácia da Conceição Teixeira, Deputy Minister of Community and Cultural Tourism, and Domingos Lopes Antunes, Deputy Minister of Trade and Industry.

List of Ministers 
The following individuals have been appointed as the Minister:

References

Footnote

Notes

External links
  – official site

Tourism, Trade and Industry